Autosport is a global motorsport publishing brand headquartered based in Richmond, London. It was established in 1950 at the same time as the origins of the Formula One World Championship.

Autosport began life as a weekly magazine in 1950 and expanded into digital publishing with the creation of Autosport.com in 1997. In 2016, Haymarket Media Group sold Autosport and the rest of its motorsport portfolio to Motorsport Network.

Autosport.com
Autosport launched its website – Autosport.com – in 1997. As distinct from the magazine, the online content is more internationally focussed and as well as covering sports news and reporting on races, Autosport.com also produces video and galleries taken from the Motorsport Images archive and in-depth long-form content in the website's subscriber-only sections.

Autosport Plus
Autosport Plus is a paywalled part of the autosport.com website with additional content.

Current editorial team

Editor - Haydn Cobb
Plus Editor - James Newbold
Grand Prix Editor - Alex Kalinauckas
F1 Reporter - Luke Smith
F1 Editor - Matt Kew
International Editor - Lewis Duncan
News Editor - Megan White
News Editor - Tom Howard
Technical Editor - Jake Boxall-Legge
Director of Digital - Jessica McFadyen
Technical Team Leader - Geoff Creighton

Autosport Magazine
Autosport first issue was published in 1950 and the weekly newsstand title has been in continuous publication ever since.

It covers all forms of motorsport from Formula 1 through to the British club racing scene. The magazine carries race and rally reports from high-profile and significant meetings from all over the world and the UK and blends this with news analysis and in-depth articles looking at contemporary cars, drivers and events as well as retrospective looks at significant characters and developments from the sport's past.

Traditionally Autosport had only focused on four-wheel racing, but its editorial expanded to include MotoGP coverage in 2014. In the past, the magazine once carried reviews of new road cars, but it is now specifically dedicated to racing and rallying.

Autosport stopped printing their magazine on 30 April 2020 due to COVID, and said that they would resume in time for the 2020 Formula 1 season. They then resumed publishing with the issue dated 3 July 2020.

Current editorial team

Since May 2016 the magazine has been edited by Kevin Turner, who was previously the editor of sister title Motorsport News. The other full-time members of staff are.

Chief Editor - Kevin Turner 
Deputy editor - Marcus Simmons
Grand Prix editor - Alex Kalinauckas 
F1 Editor - Matt Kew
F1 Reporter - Luke Smith
Technical Editor - Jake Boxall-Legge
Production Editor - Peter Hodges
Group National Editor - Stephen Lickorish
Performance and Engineering Editor - James Newbold
Deputy National Editor - Stefan Mackley
Art Director - Lynsey Elliott
Senior Designer - Michael Cavalli

In addition, the magazine features a number of freelance correspondents. Among these are F1 columnist Nigel Roebuck, Sportscar specialist Gary Watkins and British Club racing expert Marcus Pye. It also has correspondents covering club-level racing from the British domestic racing scene and prominent international races and rallies.

Editions
Autosport Asia Edition

In April 2011, Autosport re-launched Autosport Asia Edition. It is published by Bespoke Media Pte Ltd in Singapore. It is a monthly magazine instead of a weekly and the aim is that it will carry over most of the month's content from the British edition, as well as placing a very strong emphasis on the Asian motorsport scene.

Autosport Russian Edition

On 11 February 2013, launched Autosport Russian Edition.

Autosport Arabic Edition

On 1 November 2013, launched Autosport Arabic Edition.

Autosport French Edition

On 3 April 2014, launched Autosport French Edition.

Autosport Engineering & Autosport Performance

Autosport Engineering and Autosport Performance are regular supplements that appear in Autosport each month on a rotating basis. Edited by James Newbold, Autosport Engineering is derived from the section of the Autosport International Show of the same name.

The supplement has a particular focus on companies based in the UK.

Autosport International

Autosport International is a motorsport-themed exhibition, which has taken place every January at the NEC Birmingham, UK, since 1991.

Autosport Awards
The Autosport Awards, held annually at The Grosvenor House Hotel on Park Lane in London on the first weekend in December is motorsport's red carpet event, honouring the achievements of the race drivers from Formula One and other world championships, as well as recognising and promoting emerging talent.

Former Autosport Editors

References

1950 establishments in the United Kingdom
Auto racing magazines
Automobile magazines published in the United Kingdom
Magazines established in 1950
Magazines published in London
Motorcycle magazines published in the United Kingdom
Motorsport in the United Kingdom
Sports magazines published in the United Kingdom
Weekly magazines published in the United Kingdom